Nallavanniyankudikadu is a village in the Papanasam taluk of Thanjavur district, Tamil Nadu, India.

Demographics 

As per the 2001 census, Nallavanniyankudikadu had a total population of 2399 with 1207 males and 1192 females. The sex ratio was 988. The literacy rate was 79.51.

References 

 

Villages in Thanjavur district